No. 12 Air Experience Flight (AEF) is an Air Experience Flight run by the Air Cadet Organisation of the Royal Air Force.

Operational role
12 AEFs role is the teaching of basic flying to cadets of the Air Training Corps (ATC) and Combined Cadet Force (CCF) units forming part of the Edinburgh, Aberdeen and Dundee ATC Wings and CCF from the East of Scotland. It currently flies Grob Tutor T1 trainer aircraft, which it shares with East of Scotland Universities' Air Squadron.

History 

12 AEF was formed on 8 September 1958 at RAF Turnhouse, Edinburgh, equipped with Chipmunk T.10 aircraft.  On 1 April 1996, the unit moved its operational base to RAF Leuchars, where it became parented by East Lowlands Universities Air Squadron and retired its Chipmunks in favour of sharing ELUAS's Bulldog T.1 aircraft.

References

Citations

Bibliography

External links
www.habu.freeserve.co.uk (archive.org)
Air of Authority: RAF Volunteer Reserve Units

12
Royal Air Force independent flights